Claudio Giráldez González (born 24 February 1988) is a Spanish retired footballer who played as a left back, and is the manager of Celta de Vigo B.

Playing career
Born in O Porriño, Pontevedra, Galicia, Giráldez joined Real Madrid's youth setup in 2001, from hometown side Porriño Industrial FC. He made his senior debut with the C-team during the 2006–07 season, in Tercera División.

In 2007, after one appearance with Real's reserves in Segunda División B, Giráldez moved to cross-town rivals Atlético Madrid and was assigned to the B-team also in the third division.

Giráldez returned to his home region in 2009, joining fellow third tier side Pontevedra CF. He signed for CD Ourense in the fourth level on 28 July 2011, helping in their promotion to the third division in his first season; he left the latter club in May 2013.

On 17 June 2013, Giráldez agreed to a deal with Coruxo FC in the third level. After being sparingly used during the campaign, he returned to his first club Porriño in 2014, where he scored a career-best eight goals during the 2015–16 season.

Giráldez helped Porriño in their promotion to the fourth division in 2018, and retired in the following year, aged 31.

Managerial career
In 2015, while still a player, Giráldez was also named manager of Porriño Industrial's Juvenil squad. In the following year, he joined RC Celta de Vigo's structure, and was a manager of their Cadete B, Cadete A and Juvenil B squads.

On 27 June 2019, Giráldez was named in charge of Gran Peña FC, Celta's farm team, and also remained manager of their Juvenil B team. On 10 August 2021, he was appointed manager of the Juvenil División de Honor squad.

On 2 July 2022, Giráldez replaced Onésimo Sánchez at the helm of Celta's B-team; the club officially announced his new role ten days later.

References

External links

1988 births
Living people
People from O Porriño
Spanish footballers
Footballers from Galicia (Spain)
Association football defenders
Segunda División B players
Tercera División players
Real Madrid C footballers
Real Madrid Castilla footballers
Atlético Madrid B players
Pontevedra CF footballers
Pontevedra CF B footballers
CD Ourense footballers
Spanish football managers
Primera Federación managers
Celta de Vigo B managers
RC Celta de Vigo non-playing staff